This is a list of notable individuals associated with the University of Western Ontario, including graduates, former students, professors, and researchers.

Alumni

Academics and scholars

Science, technology, and medicine

Media and arts

Journalism and publishing

Film, television and theatre

Music, fine arts and architecture

Business

Government

Heather Stefanson — Premier of Manitoba

Literature
Joan Barfoot — novelist
Clare Bice — author
Alice Munro (1976) — author; 2013 Nobel Laureate in Literature for "master of the contemporary short story"
André Narbonne — writer
Paul Vermeersch (1992) — poet

Sports

Religion
Thomas Christopher Collins (M.A. English) — Canadian Cardinal of the Catholic Church

Miscellaneous
Alberto Dahik (Economy and Mathematics) — Vice President of Ecuador (1992-1995), Minister of Finance (1986) and Conservative congressman (1988-1992)
Sharon Johnston (B.Sc.) — Viceregal Consort of Canada (David Johnston)
Harley Pasternak — personal trainer
Princess Basmah Bani Ahmad of Jordan — wife of Prince Hamzah bin Al Hussein of Jordan
Sajjad Fazel — public health advocate

Faculty

Administration

Chancellors

Presidents and Vice-Chancellors

In fiction
Michael Patterson, from the comic strip For Better or For Worse

References

University of Western Ontario
 
Western Ontario
University of Western Ontario